de Kuyper or  Dekuyper is a surname. Notable people with this surname include:

Petrus De Kuyper, founder of DeKuyper
 Calvin Dekuyper (born 2000) Belgian soccer player
 Eric de Kuyper (born 1942) Belgian-Flemish-Dutch artist

See also
 Kuiper (disambiguation)
 Kuyper 
 Kuipers
 Kuypers
 Kuijpers
 Kuijper